Murtadha Nasir Nasrallah (1922–2005) was an Iraqi doctor of law, he worked as a professor at the University of Baghdad's business school. He was a celebrated author, writing some of the leading books on corporation law.

Early life and education 
Nasrallah was born in Kadhimiya in 1922. Originally from Karbala, his father Nasir Nasrallah moved to Kadhimiya early in the 20th-century. His mother was the daughter of Sheikh Muhammad-Kadhim al-Shaybani. Nasrallah claims agnatic descent from Musa al-Kadhim, the seventh Shia Imam. His ancestors on some occasions ruled Karbala, and held custodianship of its holy sites.

He completed his primary education at the Amiriya school in Kadhimiya, and went on to study his secondary studies in the Markaziya school in Baghdad. From there on he was admitted into Law school in 1943, and completed his bachelors in Law in 1947. He travelled to Switzerland in 1947, and joined the Faculty of Law at the University of Geneva. In Switzerland, he graduated with a diploma in Law in 1948, a diploma in International Law in 1949, and then a doctorate of Law in 1952.

Career 
He returned to Iraq in 1952, upon completing his PhD in Switzerland, and joined the University of Baghdad's Law school as a teacher. In 1960 he became an assisting professor, and in 1969 a professor.

He then moved to Jordan, working as a Law professor at the University of Jordan between the years 1983 and 1997. After this he retired.

Works 

 Mabādiʾ al-Qānūn al-Duwalī al-Khāṣ al-Tijārī [Principles of Private International Commercial Law] (1962).
 Al-ʾAwrāq al-Mālīyah Alatī Taṣdurhā al-Sharikāt al-Musahama [Securities issued by joint stock companies]  (1968). Research paper released in al-Balagh magazine, year #2. issues 4, 5, 6, and 7.
 Al-Sharikāt al-Tijārīyah [Trading Companies] (1969) – via New York University Libraries.

Personal life 
Nasrallah was married and had children. He was a close friend of Iraqi sociologist, Dr. Ali al-Wardi, and would often help him with his research.

Death 
Nasrallah died in 2005 in Kadhimiya, and was buried in Karbala in one of the family crypts in the old cemetery.

See also 
 Al Faiz Family
 Corporate Law
 Ali al-Wardi

References 

People from Karbala
People from Kadhimiya
1922 births
2005 deaths
20th-century Iraqi lawyers